The 1999–2000 All-Ireland Senior Club Hurling Championship was the 30th staging of the All-Ireland Senior Club Hurling Championship, the Gaelic Athletic Association's premier inter-county club hurling tournament. The championship began on 17 October 1999 and ended on 17 March 2000.

St. Joseph's Doora-Barefield were the defending champions.

On 17 March 2000, Athenry won the championship following a 0-16 to 0-12 defeat of St. Joseph's Doora-Barefield in the All-Ireland final. This was their third All-Ireland title, their first in three championship seasons.

Athenry's Eugene Cloonan was the championship's top scorer with 3-24.

Results

Connacht Senior Club Hurling Championship

First round

Quarter-final

Semi-final

Final

Leinster Senior Club Hurling Championship

First round

Quarter-finals

Semi-finals

Final

Munster Senior Club Hurling Championship

Quarter-finals

Semi-finals

Final

Ulster Senior Club Hurling Championship

Semi-finals

Final

All-Ireland Senior Club Hurling Championship

Quarter-final

Semi-finals

Final

Championship statistics

Top scorers

Top scorers overall

Top scorers in a single game

References

1999 in hurling
2000 in hurling
All-Ireland Senior Club Hurling Championship